The Pierre Angénieux ExcelLens in Cinematography is an annual award that pays tribute to a prominent international director of photography at the Cannes Film Festival. The award originated in 2013.

The name comes from Pierre Angénieux, inventor of the retrofocus zoom mechanism and founder of the French manufacturer of high-end zoom lenses. It is not awarded to a film from the Cannes Film Festival but pays tribute to a prominent director of photography whose career is commended by the industry for his/her aesthetic work.

History 
This award is organized by Angénieux, a French manufacturer of zoom lenses since 1935, official partner of the Cannes Film Festival. This award celebrates a cinematographer for his/her career, not as a brand ambassador. Despite his 2015 award, Roger A. Deakins acknowledged that he does not shoot with zoom lenses. The company explains this sponsorship, writing: "For more than 80 years, with their demanding aesthetics and techniques, directors of photography have secured the success of Angénieux zoom lenses. In honor, Angénieux turns the spotlight to these image professionals without whom cinema would not exist".

Since 2018, the promising work of a young film professional is also highlighted during the ceremony to celebrate the future of cinematography.

Awards ceremony 
The ceremony takes place within Cannes Film Festival main venue, generally during the festival's last week (month of May), with the honoree walking on the red carpet. An overview of his/her filmography is projected, then the President of Angénieux and the Director of the festival speak along with former partners who explain their experiences and the reasons of this tribute. An Angénieux zoom lens engraved with the name of the recipient is offered as the award.

A masterclass was organized during the 4th edition of the event. Peter Suschitzky presented some of his lighting techniques on his major scenes, and his collaboration with David Cronenberg

List of honored cinematographers 
 2013: Philippe Rousselot (AFC, ASC) 
 2014: Vilmos Zsigmond (HSC, ASC)
 2015: Roger A. Deakins (BSC, ASC)
 2016: Peter Suschitzky (ASC)
 2017: Christopher Doyle (HKSC)
 2018: Edward Lachman (ASC)
 Promising cinematographer: Cecile Zhang, China 
2019: Bruno Delbonnel (AFC, ASC)
Promising cinematographer: Modhura Palit, Calcutta, India.
2020: No festival due to Covid-19
2021: Agnès Godard (AFC)
Promising cinematographer: Pamela Albarrán, Mexico

References 

Cannes Film Festival